W. Lester Davis (died August 11, 1978) was an American politician and businessman from Maryland. He served as a member of the Maryland House of Delegates, representing Harford County, from 1961 to 1962.

Early life
W. Lester Davis was born in Savage, Maryland. He moved with his family, at the age of 15, to Aberdeen, Maryland.

Career
Davis was a Democrat. Davis served as a member of the Maryland House of Delegates, representing Harford County, from 1961 to 1962. He was head of the Democratic State Central Committee from 1956 to 1972.

Davis was president of Davis Concrete Company in Aberdeen. Davis purchased a  quarry in 1971 and it came to be known as Davis Quarry. He served as vice president and director of First National Bank of Northeast. He was founder and director of the Aberdeen National Bank. He was commodore and founder of the Bush River Yacht Club.

Personal life
Davis married Virginia Reamy. They had seven children, W. Lester Jr., Vickie, Sheree, Marie, Virginia, Leslie, Deborah.

Davis died on August 11, 1978, at the age of 69, at Harford Memorial Hospital in Havre de Grace.

References

Year of birth uncertain
1900s births
1978 deaths
People from Savage, Maryland
People from Harford County, Maryland
Democratic Party members of the Maryland House of Delegates
20th-century American businesspeople
American transportation businesspeople